Francesco Cascio (born 17 September 1963) is an Italian politician and dentist.

Cascio was born in Palermo on 17 September 1963. He studied dentistry. Cascio was elected to two terms on the Chamber of Deputies, serving from 1994 to 2001. He then served three consecutive terms as a member of the Sicilian Regional Assembly, from 2001 to 2012. Between 2008 and 2012, Cascio was elevated to the president of the regional assembly.

References

1963 births
Living people
Italian dentists
Forza Italia politicians
The People of Freedom politicians
Deputies of Legislature XII of Italy
Deputies of Legislature XIII of Italy
Presidents of the Sicilian Regional Assembly
Politicians from Palermo